Adrian Fisher  is a British pioneer, inventor, designer and creator of mazes, puzzles, public art, tessellations, tilings, patterns and networks of many kinds.  He is responsible for more than 700 mazes in 42 countries since 1979.

Before embarking on his career, Fisher was educated at Oundle School and Portsmouth Polytechnic.

Fisher has created 63 mirror mazes, and pioneered the extensive use of thematic chambers within mirror mazes, to achieve Mirror Maze Adventures.  He has created 44 hedge mazes, and pioneered the use of Folly Towers, Tunnels, Walk-through Parting Waterfalls and Foaming Fountain Gates in mazes.  He designed the world's first cornfield maize maze in 1993 and over 400 since, and has set 7 Guinness World Records.  He has created water mazes, most notably the award-winning Beatles Maze (with Randoll Coate and Graham Burgess), and the Jersey Water Maze.  He pioneered the genre of Path-in-Grass Mazes, and has created over a dozen around the world.

Fisher has invented several brick paving and mosaic tiling systems.  For the Orang Utan Pavement Maze at Edinburgh Zoo, he invented a new paver tessellation using 7-sided and 5-sided (regular pentagon) bricks.  The 'Fisher Paver', his second paving system uses 7-sided and 4-sided bricks and has been installed within paving projects on both sides of the Atlantic.  Its benefits include being able to achieve dynamic and intriguing designs straight off the pallet with no cutting, thus offering excellent labour productivity when laying; it only requires one new 7-sided paver shape, yet its modular scale matches all industry-standard paving systems.  Fisher's third paving system is the Mitre System, which he invented and patented together with the American mathematician Ed Pegg.  Used for both mosaics and paving, their distinctive angular shapes create unique and pleasing images.  Notable examples of its use in England include four Historic Mosaics with the Millennium Maze in Marlow, Buckinghamshire, and the 24 ft high SciTec Mosaic at Oundle School, Northamptonshire; and in America, the Tree of Life Mosaic in a private garden in Roxbury, Connecticut.

His Colour Mazes have been published in Scientific American, and walk-on examples can be found in the New York Hall of Science, Eureka Children's Museum in Halifax England, The Exploratory in Bristol, Cape Coral Children's Science Center in Florida, and over 30 other locations worldwide.

He designed the Star Map concept for London Buses, upon which was based the Spider Map system currently in use by London Buses.

In the 1980s, he co-designed the Blenheim Palace maze, that appears in the 2016 Bank of England £5 note.

Fisher designs puzzles for British newspapers and the World Puzzle Championships. The Guardian newspaper named him as one of Britain's top 50 designers.  He has written over a dozen books on mazes and puzzles, in particular The Art of the Maze (Orion Books, 1990), Secrets of the Maze (Thames & Hudson) and The Amazing Book of Mazes (Thames & Hudson, 2006).

A major Maze Art Exhibition on Adrian Fisher's work was held at the Norton Museum of Art, West Palm Beach, Florida, from January to March 1997; it included the creation of full-size permanent mazes in the surrounding landscape, and the publication "Your Land is His Canvas".

Fisher was Director of Britain's "1991 – The Year of the Maze" Tourism Campaign.  He was the recipient of the 2003 Resorgimento Award at the University of Tennessee at Knoxville, USA, on May 24, 2003, "in recognition of those who have demonstrated outstanding creativity, who have and will continue to change the world in which we live".  He gave a TEDx talk in Cape May, New Jersey, USA, on the subject of "The Pursuit of Happiness".  He was a judge of the 2009 International Labyrinth Competition in St Petersburg, Russia.

He and his wife Marie live in the village of Durweston in North Dorset, and within their grounds have a yew hedge maze with a central Folly Tower, mirrored chamber, spiral staircase and battlement walkway.

Fisher was appointed Member of the Order of the British Empire (MBE) in the 2020 Birthday Honours for services to international trade and the creative industry.

Locations of selected mosaics designed by Adrian Fisher
 The George Jackson Mosaic, SciTec Building, Oundle School, Northamptonshire, England
 'Tree of Life' Mosaic, Private Garden, Roxbury, Connecticut, USA
 4 Mosaics within the Millennium Maze, Higginson Park, Marlow, England

Locations of selected mazes designed by Adrian Fisher

UK

UK, Mirror Mazes 

 Birmingham Sea Life Centre Mirror Maze, Birmingham, England;
 Edinburgh Dungeon Mirror Maze, Scotland;
 London Dungeon Mirror Maze, England;
 Longleat House Mirror Maze, Wiltshire, England;
 Louis Tussauds Mirror Maze, Blackpool, Lancashire, England;
 Warwick Castle Dungeon Mirror Maze, Warwickshire, England;
 Wookey Hole Caves Mirror Maze, Somerset, England;
 York Dungeon Mirror Maze, York, England;
 'Punch and Judy' Mirror Maze, Dreamland Theme Park, Margate, England, 2015;

UK, other mazes 

 Alnwick Garden Bamboo Labyrinth, Northumberland;
 Adventure Wonderland Hedge Maze, Dorset, England;
 Beatles Maze, 1984 International Garden Festival, Liverpool;
 Bicton Park Fence Maze, Devon, England;
 Blackpool Pleasure Beach Hedge Maze, Lancashire, England;
 Blenheim Palace Hedge Maze, Oxfordshire, England;
 Capel Manor Hedge Maze, Hertfordshire, England;
 Escot Park Hedge Maze, Devon, England;
 Greys Court 'Archbishop's Maze', Oxfordshire, England;
 Higginson Park Maze, Marlow, Buckinghamshire;
 Holywell Bay Fun Park Fence Maze, Cornwall, England;
 Kentwell Hall Pavement Maze, Suffolk, England;
 Leeds Castle Hedge Maze, Kent, England;
 Legoland Hedge Maze, Windsor, Berkshire, England;
 Leicester University Pavement Maze, England;
 Newquay Zoo Hedge Maze, Cornwall, England;
 Parham Park Maze, West Sussex, England;
 Scone Palace Hedge Maze, Perth, Scotland;
 Hedge Maze, Speke Hall (National Trust), Merseyside, England, 2011;
 Staunton Country Park Hedge Maze, Hampshire, England;
 Water Tower Gardens Jubilee Maze, Chester, England

Europe

Czech Republic
 Castle Loucen:  collection of 10 varied mazes and labyrinths within the landscape

Denmark 
 Mirror Maze, Haunted House, Legoland, Billund, Denmark

Finland 
 Maailma Fence Maze, Finland

France
 Chateau de Thoiry Hedge Maze, near Paris, France;
 Chateau de Colombier Hedge Maze, near Rodez, France;
 Peaugres Safari Park Mirror Maze, Annonay, France

Germany
 Berlin Sea Life Centre Mirror Maze, Berlin, Germany
 Hamburg Dungeon Mirror Maze, Hamburg, Germany
 'Police Station Breakout' Mirror Maze, Legoland Deutschland, Germany, 2015

Poland
 World Labyrinth Bliziny, near Gdansk, Poland

Ireland
 Russborough House Hedge Maze, Blessington, Ireland

Italy
 Sigurta Gardens Hedge Maze, near Verona, Italy

Jersey
 Castle View Gardens Water Maze, St. Peter, Jersey, Channel Islands

Netherlands
 Texel Island Maize Maze;
 Amsterdam Dungeon Mirror Maze, Netherlands;
 Amsterdam Forest Hedge Maze, Netherlands;
 Three Lands Point Hedge Maze, Vaals, Netherlands

North America

United States
 Davis Megamaze Maize Maze, Sterling, Massachusetts, USA;
 Amazing Chicago's Funhouse Maze on Navy Pier, Chicago, Illinois, USA;
 Skyline Caverns Mirror Maze, Front Royal, Virginia, USA;
 Mall of Georgia Paving Mazes, Atlanta, Georgia, USA;
 Noah's Ark Water Park Mirror Maze, Wisconsin Dells, USA;
 Norton Museum of Art Pavement Maze, West Palm Beach, USA;
 Norton Museum of Art Serpent Mound and Turf Labyrinth, West Palm Beach, USA
 Cannery Row Mirror Maze, Monterey, California, USA
 'Palace of Sweets' Mirror Maze, Wildwood, New Jersey, USA
 'Hannah's Maze of Mirrors', Hollywood Wax Museum, Pigeon Forge, Tennessee, USA
 Elusive Butterfly Mirror Maze, Butterfly Wonderland, Scottsdale, Arizona, USA, 2013 
 'Hannah's Maze of Mirrors', Hollywood Wax Museum, Myrtle Beach, South Carolina, USA, 2014

Canada
 Larry's Party Maze, Grand Falls, New Brunswick, Canada, 2003;

Mexico
 Colour Maze, Wol-Ha Children's Museum, Mexico
 Coral Reef Mirror Maze, Gran Plaza Mall, Guadalajara, Mexico, 2011
 Candy Mirror Maze, Chetumal, Mexico, 2011
 Egyptian Mirror Maze, Monterrey, Mexico, 2011
 Pirate Mirror Maze, Pachuca, Mexico, 2011

South America

Colombia
 Bogota Children's Museum Maze Garden, Colombia, South America

Chile
 Space Adventure Mirror Maze, Kidzania, Santiago, Chile, South America

Asia

China
 Christmas Maze, Hong Kong, 2014
 Squirrel Mirror Maze, Harbin, China, 2015

Dubai
 The Maze Tower, Dubai, UAE; winner of Guinness World Record for world's tallest maze.

India
 Imax Theatre Mirror Maze, Hyderabad, India
 Disco Club Mirror Maze, Gurgaon, Delhi, India, 2011
 Ali Baba Mirror Maze, Esselworld Theme Park, Mumbai, 2015

Japan
 Huistenbosh Park Mirror Maze, Japan;
 Seibu Park Mirror Maze, Japan;
 Spanish Village Mirror Maze, Japan;
 Tobu Zoo Mirror Maze, Japan
 Tokyo Dome Mirror Maze, Japan
 Tokyo Tower Mirror Maze, Japan, 2015

Singapore
 Hedge Maze, The Jewel, Changi International Airport, Singapore
 Mirror Maze, The Jewel, Changi International Airport, Singapore
 Professor Crackitt's Mirror Maze, Singapore Science Centre, Singapore

South Korea
 Jeju Island Hedge Maze, South Korea (Kimnyung Maze)

Thailand
 Ripleys Mirror Maze, Pattaya, Thailand

Vietnam
 Mirror Maze, Vietnam

See also
 Randoll Coate – Fisher's original partner in maze design

References

External links
 Adrianfisherdesign.com – Adrian Fisher's official maze website
 Alnwickgarden.com – Alnwick Garden
 Beatles Maze – 1984 International Garden Festival, Liverpool
 Glasgow Green Trials – American cornfield maze for MG sports cars inspired by Adrian Fisher

1951 births
Living people
Mazes
People educated at Oundle School
Puzzle designers
Members of the Order of the British Empire